Paul Zanolini (August 13, 1898 – June 8, 1989) was an American wrestler. He competed in the Greco-Roman middleweight event at the 1920 Summer Olympics.

References

External links
 

1898 births
1989 deaths
American male sport wrestlers
Olympic wrestlers of the United States
Sportspeople from Colorado
Wrestlers at the 1920 Summer Olympics